European route E 661 is a part of the inter-European road system.

Itinerary
The E 661 routes through three European countries:

: Balatonkeresztúr - Nagyatád - Barcs

: Terezino Polje - Virovitica - Grubišno Polje - Daruvar - Pakrac - Lipik - Okučani - Stara Gradiška

: Gradiška - Banja Luka
: Banja Luka - Jajce (Start of Concurrency of ) - Donji Vakuf
: Donji Vakuf - Travnik - Zenica

External links 
 UN Economic Commission for Europe: Overall Map of E-road Network (2007)

699661
E661
E661
E661